Col. Elias Earle Historic District is a national historic district located at Greenville, South Carolina. It encompasses 74 contributing buildings in a middle-class neighborhood of Greenville.  The houses primarily date from about 1915 to 1930, and include Neoclassical, Colonial Revival, Tudor Revival, and bungalow styles.  The district was originally part of the estate of Colonel Elias Earle, a prominent early-19th century Greenville citizen. The Earle St.
Baptist Church is located in the district.

It was added to the National Register of Historic Places in 1982.

References

Houses on the National Register of Historic Places in South Carolina
Historic districts on the National Register of Historic Places in South Carolina
Neoclassical architecture in South Carolina
Colonial Revival architecture in South Carolina
Tudor Revival architecture in South Carolina
Houses in Greenville, South Carolina
National Register of Historic Places in Greenville, South Carolina
Historic districts in Greenville County, South Carolina